Echis carinatus astolae, known as the Astola saw-scaled viper, is a viper subspecies endemic to Astola Island off the coast of Pakistan. Like all other vipers, it is venomous.

Description
The color pattern consists of a series of dark brown dorsal blotches on a whitish background. Laterally, there are 1-3 rows of dark brown spots with no light arcs. On the head, there is a three-pronged, light mark directed towards the snout. From the temporals, a light lateral line meets at the frontal region, with a branch to the snout.

Geographic range
Echis carinatus astolae is found only on Astola Island, off the coast of Makran, Pakistan.

The type locality is therefore the same: "Insel Astola, Makranküste, West-Pakistan" [Astola Island (25o 07' N; 63o 51' E) off the Makran coast, Pakistan].

References

Further reading
 Mertens R. 1970. Die Amphibien und Reptilien West-Pakistans. 1. Nachtrag. Stuttgarter Beiträge zur Naturkunde aus dem Staatlichen Museum für Naturkunde in Stuttgart (216): 1-5. ("Echis carinatus astolae n. subsp.", pp. 3–4).

External links
 
 

Viperinae
Reptiles of Pakistan
Endemic fauna of Pakistan